The 2022 Newcastle City Council election took place on 5 May 2022. One third of councillors — 26 out of 78 — on Newcastle City Council were elected. The election took place alongside other local elections across the United Kingdom.

In the previous council election in 2021, the Labour Party maintained its control of the council, holding 52 seats after the election. There were twenty Liberal Democrat councillors, four independent councillors and two Newcastle Independents.

Background

History 

The Local Government Act 1972 created a two-tier system of metropolitan counties and districts covering Greater Manchester, Merseyside, South Yorkshire, Tyne and Wear, the West Midlands, and West Yorkshire starting in 1974. Newcastle was a district of the Tyne and Wear metropolitan county. The Local Government Act 1985 abolished the metropolitan counties, with metropolitan districts taking on most of their powers as metropolitan boroughs. The North of Tyne Combined Authority was created in 2018 and began electing the mayor of the North of Tyne from 2019, which was given strategic powers covering a region covering some of the same area as the former Tyne and Wear metropolitan county, as well as Northumberland.

Since its creation, Newcastle has variously been under Labour, Liberal Democrat and Conservative control. The Liberal Democrats held a majority of seats on the council from 2004 until 2011, when Labour gained enough seats to control the council. Nick Forbes became leader of the council. Labour continued to gain seats until the 2019 election, when the party lost two seats but continued to have an overall majority. In the 2021 Newcastle City Council election, Labour lost another two seats to hold 52, having won 18 of the 28 up for election with 39.2% of the vote. The Liberal Democrats held 20 seats, having received 19.5% of the vote. Four independents and two Newcastle Independents completed the council, with independent candidates receiving 7.0% of the vote across the borough and Newcastle Independents candidate receiving 6.8% of the vote. The Conservatives received 17.6% of the vote and the Green Party received 9.1% of the vote but neither party won any seats.

The Local Government Boundary Commission for England produced new boundaries for Newcastle ahead of the 2018 election, meaning that the 2018 elections were all-out, with all councillors being elected before returning to electing by thirds. Candidates up for re-election in 2022 are those who came first in each ward in 2018.

Council term 
Following the 2021 election, Nick Kemp challenged Nick Forbes for the council leadership. Forbes had served as a councillor since 2000, as Labour group leader since 2007 and council leader since 2011. Kemp had served as a councillor since 2002, and in 2020 had resigned as cabinet member for environmental and regulatory services, saying that he was being undermined. At the time, Forbes said that he had recently received complaints about Kemp. Kemp stood against Forbes at the Labour Group's post-election annual general meeting; while another councillor, Karen Kilgour stood against the incumbent deputy leader Joyce McCarty. Forbes won the contest with 30 votes to Kemp's 22. Kilgour, regarded as an ally to Kemp, was elected deputy leader by 28 votes to 24.

The Liberal Democrat councillor Anita Lower died in July 2021 having served as a councillor for 25 years. The Liberal Democrat candidate Thom Campion successfully defended the seat in the subsequent by-election, with Labour coming second.

Forbes failed to win reselection as the Labour candidate for his ward after local members voted 13-4 to select another candidate, the local activist Abdul Samad, instead. He said he wouldn't contest the selection, which he called an "ambush" by members on the left-wing of his party, or change wards, but that withdrawing from the election was "honourable choice". He remained in position as council leader but asked for a new Labour group leader to be chosen ahead of the election so that voters would know what to expect from the Labour Party. Three councillors sought to replace him: Kemp, Clare Penny-Evans and Irim Ali. In the first round of voting, Kemp received 26 votes, Penny-Evans received 22 and Ali received four. Kemp was elected in the second round with 27 votes, while Penny-Evans received 24. Kemp had previously been supported by left-wing councillors who saw Forbes as being more centrist. He promised to give 10% of his salary as leader to a fund for community groups, and said that his leadership would contribute "fresh ideas, based on fundamental values of inclusivity and opportunity for all" to the city.

Electoral process 
The council elects its councillors in thirds, with a third being up for election every year for three years, with no election in the fourth year. The election will take place by first-past-the-post voting, with wards generally being represented by three councillors, with one elected in each election year to serve a four-year term.

All registered electors (British, Irish, Commonwealth and European Union citizens) living in Newcastle aged 18 or over will be entitled to vote in the election. People who live at two addresses in different councils, such as university students with different term-time and holiday addresses, are entitled to be registered for and vote in elections in both local authorities. Voting in-person at polling stations will take place from 07:00 to 22:00 on election day, and voters will be able to apply for postal votes or proxy votes in advance of the election.

Previous council composition

Results summary

Ward results

Arthur's Hill

Benwell and Scotswood

Blakelaw

Byker

Callerton and Throckley

Castle

Chapel

Dene and South Gosforth

Denton and Westerhope

Elswick

Fawdon and West Gosforth

Gosforth

Heaton

Kenton

Kingston Park South and Newbiggin Hall

Lemington

Manor Park

Monument

North Jesmond

Ouseburn

Parklands

South Jesmond

Walker

Walkergate

West Fenham

Wingrove

By-elections

Byker

References 

Newcastle City Council elections
Newcastle